Jalan Bandar Seri Jempol, Federal Route 244, is a federal road in Bandar Seri Jempol, Jempol, Negeri Sembilan, Malaysia. The Kilometre Zerois at Bandar Seri Jempol-FT10 junctions.

Features
At most sections, the Federal Route 244 was built under the JKR U5 road standard, allowing maximum speed limit of up to 50 km/h.

List of junctions and towns

References

Malaysian Federal Roads